Charles Moss (6 March 1882 – 25 July 1963) was an English road racing cyclist who competed in the 1912 Summer Olympics. He was born in Ascott-under-Wychwood, Oxfordshire.

He was part of the Great Britain team which won the silver medal in the team time trial. In the individual time trial he finished 18th.

References

External links
 
 
 

1882 births
1963 deaths
English male cyclists
Cyclists at the 1912 Summer Olympics
Olympic cyclists of Great Britain
Olympic silver medallists for Great Britain
Olympic medalists in cycling
People from Ascot, Berkshire
Medalists at the 1912 Summer Olympics